Lisa L. Sutton (born October 3, 1963) is a Judge of the  Washington Court of Appeals.

Biography 
Sutton is serving as a judge on the Washington Court of Appeals, Division Two, in Tacoma. She previously served as a judge on the Thurston County Superior Court. Prior to joining the bench, Judge Sutton worked for the Attorney General's Office as a managing attorney and civil litigator.

References 

1963 births
Living people
People from Saginaw, Michigan
Superior court judges in the United States
Wayne State University alumni
Washington (state) lawyers